Aşubcan Kadın ("Queen bee's spirit";  1793 – 10 June 1870), called also Aşubican Kadin, was a consort of Sultan Mahmud II of the Ottoman Empire.

Life
Daughter of a Bulgarian delegate and born in 1793, Aşubcan, called also Aşubican, entered in Mahmud II's harem on 1808, and was given the title of "Fifth Kadin" (consorts). On 5 July 1809 she gave birth her first daughter, Ayşe Sultan, Who died on February 1810. On 16 June 1811 she gave birth to her second daughter Saliha Sultan in the Topkapı Palace. Traditional birth ceremony was arranged in the imperial harem, which was attended by Mahmud's mother, wives, and sisters. On this occasion Valide sultan Nakşidil Sultan presented Aşubcan with presents. She was followed a year later by a third daughter, Şah Sultan, born on 22 May 1812, who died at the age of two in September 1814.

She was then elevated to the title of "Fourth Kadin", and later to the title of "Third Kadin" and at end "Second Kadın". In 1834, her daughter married Damat Gürcü Halil Rifat Pasha, and went to live in Fındıklı Palace.

After Mahmud's death in 1839, his son Sultan Abdulmejid I, son of Bezmiâlem Kadın, ascended the throne. Aşubcan moved to live in the Beşiktaş waterfront Palace, and later in Çamlıca, and Maçka Palaces. In 1843 her only survived daughter also died. In 1861, after the death of Abdulmejid, his half-brother Sultan Abdulaziz, son of Pertevniyal Kadin,  ascended the throne. Aşubcan often wrote letters to both of her stepsons, and was even visited by them at her palace.

Death
Aşubcan Kadın died on 10 June 1870, and was buried the mausoleum of her husband located at the Divanyolu street.

Issue
Together with Mahmud, Aşubcan had at least three daughters:
 Ayşe Sultan (5 July 1809 - February 1810). Buried in the Nurosmaniye mosque. 
 Saliha Sultan (Topkapı Palace, 16 June 1811 - Istanbul, Turkey, 5 February 1843, buried in Sultan Mahmud II Mausoleum, Divanyolu, Istanbul).
 Şah Sultan (22 May 1812 – September 1814, buried in Nuruosmaniye Mosque, Fatih, Istanbul).

In popular culture
In 2018 Turkish historical fiction TV series Kalbimin Sultanı, Aşubcan is portrayed by Turkish actress Açelya Devrim Yılhan.

See also
Ottoman Imperial Harem
List of consorts of the Ottoman sultans

References

Sources

1795 births
1870 deaths